Pumilus may refer to:
 Pumilus (brachiopod), a genus of brachiopods in the family Kraussinidae
 Pumilus (fungus), a genus of funguses in the class Sordariomycetes, order and family unassigned